São Tomé and Príncipe competed at the 2000 Summer Olympics in Sydney, Australia, which took place between 15 September to 1 October 2000. The country's participation in Sydney marked its second appearance at the Summer Olympics since its debut in the 1996 Summer Olympics.

The São Tomé and Príncipe delegation included two athletes, Arlindo Pinheiro and Naide Gomes, were selected to represent the nation via wildcards, as the nation had no athletes that met either the "A" or "B" qualifying standards. The events the two athletes competed in were the men's 110m hurdles and the women's 100m hurdles respectively. Gomes was selected as flag bearer for the flag bearer for the opening ceremony. Pinheiro would also become the nation's oldest participant at the Summer Olympics at 29 years and 182 days; this stood until the 2008 Summer Olympics, when Celma Soares surpassed it. Ultimately, neither athlete progressed beyond the heats in their events, meaning São Tomé and Príncipe won no medals at this Summer Olympics.

Background 
São Tomé and Príncipe participated in two Summer Olympic games between its debut in the 1996 Summer Olympics in Atlanta, United States and the 2000 Summer Olympics. No São Tomé and Príncipe athlete had ever won a medal at the Summer Olympics prior to the Sydney Games.

The São Tomé and Príncipe National Olympic Committee (NOC) selected two athletes via wildcards. Usually a NOC would be able to select up to three athletes per event providing that each athlete passed the "A" standard time for that event. However, since São Tomé and Príncipe had no athletes that met either standard for any event, they were allowed to select their best two athletes, one of each gender, to represent the nation at the Games.

Athletics 

Men

Track and road events

Women

Track and road events

References

Wallechinsky, David (2004). The Complete Book of the Summer Olympics (Athens 2004 Edition). Toronto, Canada. . 
International Olympic Committee (2001). The Results. Retrieved 12 November 2005.
Sydney Organising Committee for the Olympic Games (2001). Official Report of the XXVII Olympiad Volume 1: Preparing for the Games. Retrieved 20 November 2005.
Sydney Organising Committee for the Olympic Games (2001). Official Report of the XXVII Olympiad Volume 2: Celebrating the Games. Retrieved 20 November 2005.
Sydney Organising Committee for the Olympic Games (2001). The Results. Retrieved 20 November 2005.
International Olympic Committee Web Site

Sao Tome and Principe
2000
2000 in São Tomé and Príncipe